Shakthi is a 1983 Indian Telugu-language action drama film directed by K. Raghavendra Rao for Gopi Movies starring Krishna, Radha, Jayasudha and Rao Gopala Rao. Chakravarthy scored and composed the film's soundtrack. The film was declared a Blockbuster at the box office.

The film set on a village backdrop featured Krishna in dual roles as Ramu and Krishna. The film marked the fifth collaboration of Raghavendra Rao with Krishna after Bhale Krishnudu, Gharana Donga, Ooriki Monagadu and Adavi Simhalu.

The film was remade in Hindi as Kaamyab.

Cast 
 Krishna as Ramu and Krishna
 Jayasudha as Seeta
 Radha
 Rao Gopala Rao as Chinthapikkala Narasaraju
 Allu Ramalingaiah
 Giribabu as Giri
 Kanta Rao
Prabhakar Reddy as P. K. Bir
Mada as Narasaraju's son
 Chalapathi Rao as Bhimudu
Potti Prasad
Sarathi as Inspector
P. J. Sarma
Subha
Annapurna
Nirmalamma
Chidathala Appa Rao as Constable

Soundtrack

Release and Reception 
The film was released on 2 September 1983 to positive reviews. The film had a theatrical run of 48 days in Hyderabad, 100 days in Vizag, 100 days in Nellore and 100 days in Guntur.

References

External links 

1983 films
1983 action films
1980s Telugu-language films
Indian action films
Films directed by K. Raghavendra Rao
Films scored by K. Chakravarthy
Telugu films remade in other languages